

1569–1699
Silver Age of The Republic
 September 8, 1581 - Siege of Psków - Polish–Lithuanian Commonwealth - Russia
 October 19, 1595 - Battle of Cecora - Polish–Lithuanian Commonwealth - Turkey
 September 27, 1605 - Battle of Kircholm - Polish–Lithuanian Commonwealth - Sweden
 July 4, 1610 - Battle of Kłuszyn - Polish–Lithuanian Commonwealth - Russia & Sweden - after this battle Poland conquered Moscow.
 September 1, 1612 - Battle of Moscow - Polish–Lithuanian Commonwealth - Russia
 September 20, 1620 - Battle of Cecora - Polish–Lithuanian Commonwealth - Turkey
 September 2, 1621 - Battle of Chocim - Polish–Lithuanian Commonwealth - Turkey
 November 28, 1627 - Battle of Oliwa - Polish–Lithuanian Commonwealth - Sweden
 July 10 - August 22, 1649 - Defense of Zbaraż - Polish–Lithuanian Commonwealth - Cossacks & Crimea
 June 28, 1651 - Battle of Beresteczko - Polish–Lithuanian Commonwealth - Cossacks
 January 29, 1655 - Battle of Ochamatów - Polish–Lithuanian Commonwealth - Russia
 November 18, 1655 - Defense of Jasna Góra - Polish–Lithuanian Commonwealth - Sweden
 July 20, 1657 - Battle of Czarny Ostrów - Polish–Lithuanian Commonwealth - Sweden
 November 11, 1673 - Battle of Chocim - Polish–Lithuanian Commonwealth - Turkey
 September 12, 1683 - Battle of Vienna - Polish–Lithuanian Commonwealth - Turkey - One of the most important battles in Europe

1700–1795
Fall of the Republic
 February 29, 1768 - Confederation of Bar is formed.
 July 27, 1768 - The Siege of Kraków begins.
 1770 - The Battle of Dobra takes place.
 May 21, 1771 - The Battle of Lanckorona takes place.
 September 6 - The Battle of Antopol takes place.
 1792 - The War in Defense of the Constitution begins.
 The Battle of Mir takes place.
 The Battle of Zelwa takes place.
 June 18 - The Battle of Zielenice takes place.
 July 18 - The Battle of Dubienka takes place.
 April 2 - The Battle of Racławice takes place.
 The Warsaw Uprising takes place.
 The Wilno Uprising takes place.
 June 6 - The Battle of Szczekociny takes place.
 June 8 - The Battle of Chelmno takes place.
 October 10 - The Battle of Maciejowice takes place.
 November 4 - Massacre of Praga takes place.

1795–1914
Age of Partition
1807–1815 - Duchy of Warsaw: puppet state in ally with the First French Empire: various Polish formations fighting within the French army, the Duchy's forces took part in the invasion on the Russian state: Battle of Borodino, Battle of Berezina;1815–1830 - the puppet Polish Kingdom, ruled by tsars (kings of Poland), with some autonomy, especially separate armed forces, which fought in the Polish-Russian War 1830–1831, largely known as the November Uprising; after the war the Kingdom became officially part of the Russian Empire, hence all Polish forces were disbanded.The Polish under the rule of Berlin and Vienna had no military formations of their own until World War I.

1914–1922
Age of regaining independence
 1914–1918 - First World War
 1918 - Greater Poland Uprising
 1919 - First Silesian Uprising
 1919 - Sejny Uprising - should have been a part of secret services staged coup against Lithuanian government
 1919–1920 - Polish-Soviet War
 1920 - Second Silesian Uprising
 1921 - Third Silesian Uprising

1923–1948
Age of the Second Republic
World War II

1948–present
Present age
 2003–present Iraq War
 Afghanistan War

References

Polish history timelines
Polish Land Forces
Polish Army